Wayil is a tourist village in the Ganderbal District of Jammu and Kashmir, India. It is located on the bank of Sind River, around 8 km from Ganderbal, 30 km northeast from Srinagar, at NH 1D which connects Srinagar and Ladakh.

Tourism 
The Wayil village is a picnic spot noted for its scenic beauty, covered with the green lush mountains on the bank of Sind River. It is popular among the tourists for its peaceful environment as it is only one hour drive away from the Srinagar City. The Sind River has a mesmerizing sound a cool breeze all around during the summer.

The village is a base camp for trekkers to the alpine meadows of Mohanmarg and Laarmarg. It is also holds a suspension bridge (18 meters) over Sind River. A number of restaurants and huts are available for boarding and lodging. The popular tourist activities  include fishing of trout. Apart from this Wayil serves as a place for swimming for young people because of two river channels flowing there.

References 

Villages in Ganderbal district